Françoise-Joseph Duret (12 November 1729 – 7 August 1816) was a French sculptor.  He was the father and teacher of Francisque Joseph Duret.

Born at Valenciennes, the son of Charles Durez, of Spanish origin, Duret was prince of the Academy of St. Luke, a member of the Académie royale de peinture et de sculpture, and sculptor and decorator for Honoré Armand de Villars. His reception piece at the Academy, representing Diogenes looking for a man, is at the Museum of Fine Arts of Valenciennes. He married the daughter of his brother Jean-François Last. Joseph Duret had had several children all of whom died, before his son Francisque Joseph Duret survived, and became a renowned artist in his own right.

References
 
 Gazette des Beaux-Arts, Paris, J. Claye, 1866 (read online), p. 100.
 Journal of the Academy of Toulouse and other academies of the Empire, vol. 23-24, Toulouse, Delboy & Armaing, 1866, p. 208.
 Edouard Pommier, A Chalgrin collaborator, François-Joseph Duret (1729-1816), sculptor and ornamental sculptor figurist, Bulletin of the Society of the History of French Art, 1985 Paris, 1987, p. 137.
 

18th-century French sculptors
French male sculptors
19th-century French sculptors
People from Valenciennes
1729 births
1816 deaths
19th-century French male artists
18th-century French male artists